This is a list of notable buildings in the city of Cusco, Peru. The city of Cusco is a World Heritage Site by UNESCO. The list is ordered by the groundbreaking date of each building.

Pre-Columbian buildings
They are listed with its names in the modern Quechua orthography.

Colonial buildings

Churches
The list is incomplete.

Other buildings

Republican buildings (post-colonial)

See also
History of Cusco

References

 
Cusco
Cusco

Architecture in Peru
Cusco
Cusco